Trondheim Jazz Orchestra (TJO) (established 1999 in Trondheim, Norway) is an orchestral project based in Trondheim, and closely related to both the Midtnorsk Jazzsenter (MNJ - Mid Norwegian Jazz Center) and Jazz Line at the Trøndelag Conservatory of Music (NTNU).

Biography 

During the 1990s the orchestra was a plain conservatory-band (Konsen Big Band). In 2000 the name of the band was changed to TJO. An important feature with Trondheim Jazz Orchestra is the band's flexible and varying size crew. The orchestra works on a project basis and performs mainly commissioned works of selected composers.

TJO has collaborated with Norwegian composers such as Erlend Skomsvoll, Eirik Hegdal, Vigleik Storaas, Jon Balke, Knut Kristiansen, Geir Lysne, Terje Rypdal and Bendik Hofseth, as well as with international soloists such as Chick Corea, Pat Metheny, New York Voices, Birger Sulsbruck and Joshua Redman.

In 2001 TJO toured Norway extensively with Chick Corea, a cooperation based on the concert at Moldejazz 2000. The collaboration resulted in a CD-release (Live in Molde), which has sold more than 8000 copies in Norway. The collaboration with Chick Corea was resumed in 2006 with a concert at the Hilton Ballroom in New York City during the Annual Jazz Conference (IAJE) in January of that year. This concert was a huge success, and as a result the orchestra was invited to the Tokyo Jazz Festival 2006. The cooperation between TJO and Chick Corea was successful once again and well received by a huge group of spectators while also being televised nationally. John Kelman, All About Jazz, states: "... a far reaching orchestra clearly capable of handling anything and everything that's put in front of it".

In 2003 the orchestra went on tour in Norway with Pat Metheny. This edition of TJO included musicians such as Live Maria Roggen, Ola Kvernberg and Steinar Nickelsen. On Moldejazz 2006 TJO did a project with music by Eirik Hegdal featuring Joshua Redman as a soloist, followed by a tour in the late fall of 2008. During Trondheim Chamber Music Festival TJO gave their first performance of commissioned work by saxophonist Bendik Hofseth. In 2007 Trondheim Jazz Orchestra were chosen to be the first national «Big Jazz Ensemble» to receive a permanent state subsidy. In 2012 TJO performed at the "Ultima Festival" in Oslo, Norway, performing a new work by Kim Myhr that, in addition to the guitarist, also featured singer Jenny Hval.

Honors 
2014: Spellemannprisen in the category Jazz, with Marius Neset for the album Lion

Discography 
 2005: Live in Molde with Chick Corea (MNJ Records) – live recorded at Moldejazz 2000
 2005: We Are? with Eirik Hegdal (Jazzaway) – recorded in 2004. featuring vocalist Siri Gjære.
 2006: Tribute with Vigleik Storaas (MNJ Records) – live recorded in 2004 from 25 years anniversary for the Jazz Line at (NTNU)
 2007: Live in Oslo with Maria Kannegaard Trio (MNJ Records) – from the Cosmopolite jazz scene in Oslo. music arranged by Eirik Hegdal.
 2008: Wood And Water (MNJ Records) – 24 songs by Eirik Hegdal, with contributions by hired Siri Gjære, Nils-Olav Johansen, Ståle Storløkken, Ole Morten Vågan and Tor Haugerud
 2008: Trondheim Jazz Orchestra & Kobert (Kobert Self-Released) – studio Version of the commissioned work to Moldejazz 2008
 2009: What If? A counterfactual fairytale (MNJ Records) – feat. Erlend Skomsvoll
 2010: Stems and Cages (MNJ Records) – Kim Myhr's commissioned work to Moldejazz 2009, with contributions by among others Sidsel Endresen, Christian Wallumrød and Ingar Zach
 2010: Triads and More (MNJ Records) – feat. Eirik Hegdal & Joshua Redman
 2011: Morning Songs (MNJ Records) – under the direction of composer and bass player Per Zanussi
 2011: Kinetic Music (MNJ Records) – feat. Magic Pocket
 2011: Migrations (MNJ Records) – feat. Øyvind Brække
 2012: The Death Defying Unicorn (Rune Grammofon) – feat. Motorpsycho and Supersilent keyboardist Ståle Storløkken
 2013: Sidewalk Comedy (MNJ Records) – feat. Eirik Hegdal
 2014: Ekko (MNJ Records) – feat. Elin Rosseland
 2014: Lion (ACT Music) – under the direction of Marius Neset
 2015: Savages (MNJ Records) – feat. Kristoffer Lo
 2016: In the End His Voice Will Be the Sound of Paper with Kim Myhr & Jenny Hval (Hubro)

References

External links

Trondheim Jazzorkester på Facebook

Big bands
Norwegian jazz ensembles
Spellemannprisen winners
Musical groups established in 1999
1999 establishments in Norway
Musical groups from Trondheim